Laurence Acton may refer to:
Laurence Acton (senior) (died 1386/7), English MP
Laurence Acton (junior), MP